Estonia-Sri Lanka relations are foreign relations between  Estonia and Sri Lanka. Estonia has an embassy Colombo. Sri Lanka has a non resident embassy in Stockholm. Estonia's 2004 accession to the European Union had a positive effect on bilateral relations with Sri Lanka, since the EU is one of Sri Lanka's biggest donors and trade partners.

History
Sri Lanka first recognized Estonia on 10 October 1991, and diplomatic relations were established on 31 January 1996. Since Estonia's induction into the European Union it has had a positive effect on bilateral relations with Sri Lanka, since the EU is one of Sri Lanka's biggest donors and trade partners.

On April 30, 2009 an invitation was given by Ambassador Jayasooriya to the Speaker of the Estonian Parliament to visit Sri Lanka and strengthen the relationship between the two countries when the Sri Lankan Ambassador met Toomas Hendrik Ilves, the President of Estonia.

In 2009, Kaido Kotkas of Estonia argued for closer relations with Sri Lanka:
Sri Lankan people, in fact lots of them, don’t know much about Estonia and the majority of the Estonians do not know anything about Sri Lanka, either. To know each other and to establish acquaintances, at least we have to start a process of communication, establish contacts, visit and become friends. It is nice to visit as friends. It is nice to invite each other as friends and ask them to come down to play some tennis or badminton or to have some lunch or dinner together. After establishing some form of a mutual understanding, after exploring some form of commonness between us and by then we will have some common topics to talk about.	

Estonia's first consulate in Sri Lanka was declared opened on the 24th of February 2011.

High level meetings
On 25 September 2003, the Estonian Foreign Minister Kristiina Ojuland and Sri Lankan Prime Minister Ranil Wickremesinghe met during the UN General Assembly in New York City.

High level visits
To date, there has been no state visits by leaders of either country.  There has been only one visit by a government minister to the other country. The Estonian Minister of Foreign Affairs, Urmas Paet, along with a key trade delegation, visited Sri Lanka in February 2013 with a goal of strengthening bilateral trade and other investment opportunities, in areas such as maritime, railways, infrastructure, defense and tourism. During their visit they met with Sri Lanka's Minister of Defence and Urban Development Gotabaya Rajapaksa, Sri Lanka's Minister for Economic Development Basil Rajapakse and Sri Lanka's Minister of Industry and Commerce Risad Badhiutheen

Economic relations 
Economic ties between Sri Lanka and Estonia are very low. During the last five years the total trade between the two countries has recorded less than two and half million US$ a year. Sri Lanka was placed 78th among Estonia's trade partners in 2007 resulting in a total trade turnover between Estonia and Sri Lanka of 28.5 million kroons. Sri Lanka ranked 89th among Estonia's export partners and 61st among import partners in 2007. The balance of trade between two countries has been favourable for Estonia except in 2000. Sri Lanka is the biggest Black Tea supplier and the second biggest Green Tea supplier to the Estonian market.

Main Estonian exports in 2007:
 Machinery and equipment – 52%
 Paper and paper products – 43%

Main Estonian imports in 2007:
 Plant products (mostly tea) – 47%
 Plastic and rubber products – 41%
 Machinery and equipment – 5%
 Textile and textile products – 2%

Trade between Estonia and Sri Lanka 2000–2007 (in thousand EUR):

Agreements
Intergovernmental Agreement for Co-operation in Culture, Education and Science (2005) which "foresees interlibrary loaning, creating contacts between universities and other educational and scientific establishments, exchanging of TV and radio programmes, and co-operation between sports and youth organisations."
Agreement for Co-operation Between the Estonian Chamber of Commerce and Industry and the Ceylon Chamber of Commerce (2000)

Tourism
The Estonian President Toomas Hendrik Ilves has acknowledged that Sri Lanka is a very attractive tourist destination and has suggested that Sri Lanka should concentrate on promoting Estonian tourists to Sri Lanka as Estonians are interested in visiting destinations with diversified tourist attractions.

In 2015, it was reported that around 2000 Estonian tourists visit Sri Lanka and year.

See also
 Foreign relations of Estonia
 Foreign relations of Sri Lanka

References

Sri Lanka
Bilateral relations of Sri Lanka